Paul Schenly (born April 15, 1948) is an American classical pianist. He is the founder and director of the summer music festival Pianofest in the Hamptons. He also serves as the artistic director of the Cleveland International Piano Competition and was the head of the piano department at the Cleveland Institute of Music.

Early life and education
Paul Schenly was born in Munich in 1948. He lived in South America before coming to the United States at the age of five. He holds a master's degree from the Cleveland Institute of Music, where he studied with Victor Babin. Schenly is an alumnus of the Music Academy of the West where he attended the piano programme in 1964, 1965 and 1969.

Career
Winner of the prestigious Avery Fisher Career Grant, Schenly has been a soloist with a number of major United States orchestras, including the Atlanta Symphony Orchestra, the Cleveland Orchestra, the Chicago Symphony Orchestra, the Los Angeles Philharmonic, the San Francisco Symphony, and the New York Philharmonic. He made two United States tours with the Rotterdam Philharmonic Orchestra and toured with the same orchestra in Europe. He has appeared in many summer festivals, including repeated performances at the Hollywood Bowl, the Ravinia Festival, Blossom Music Center, and the Mostly Mozart Festival.

Schenly appeared in the Great Performers Series at Lincoln Center, the Royal Concertgebouw, Royal Albert Hall, and in acclaimed recitals at Carnegie Hall. He has performed with many of the world's leading conductors, including Christoph Eschenbach, James Levine, Erich Leinsdorf, Christoph von Dohnányi,  Zubin Mehta,  Lorin Maazel, Edo de Waart, Mstislav Rostropovich, Robert Shaw, Aaron Copland, Michael Tilson Thomas, and Kiril Kondrashin.

Schenly has served on the juries of several national and international competitions, and his students have won many national and international prizes. He has served on the jury of the Beethoven Competition in Bonn and Mozart Competition in Salzburg. He is also on the advisory board of the American Pianists Foundation and on the nominating committee for the Gilmore Piano Foundation. He has recorded for Sine Qua Non and RCA.

Schenly is the artistic director of the Cleveland International Piano Competition. He is also an artist in residence at the Cleveland Institute of Music, where he served on the faculty was the chairman of the piano department for over 25 years.

Pianofest
Schenly founded Pianofest in the Hamptons in 1989. Former Pianofest students include and Awadagin Pratt, Anthony Molinaro, Sergei Babayan, Kathryn Brown, Hsin-Bei Lee, Myong Joo-Lee, Margarita Shevchenko, Alexander Slobodyanik, Orion Weiss, Michael Brown, Andrew Russo, Yung Wook Yoo, Qin Chuan, Van Cuong, Konstantin Soukhovetski, Soyeon Lee, and, more recently, Di Wu, Daria Rabotkina, and Gilles Vonsattel. Former guest artists include Yefim Bronfman, Andre Watts, Richard Goode, Anton Nel, Claude Frank, Arie Vardi, Melvin Chen, Jerome Lowenthal, Blair McMillen, and Yoheved Kaplinsky.

Personal
Schenly resides in Cleveland and New York City and, during the summer, in East Hampton, New York.

See also
Cleveland Institute of Music

References

External links
"Pianofest in the Hamptons". Pianofest.com.
"Recital: Pianism by Paul Schenly". The New York Times. 14 February 1978.
"Piano: Schenly Plays Mussorgsky". The New York Times. 4 March 1982.
"Prize Musicians Warm Up for Summer". The New York Times. 15 June 1997.
"In the Hamptons, Music Fest Revs Up". The New York Times. 18 June 2000.
"Music: The Ocean Sings in the Background". The New York Times. 23 July 2003.
"The Magic Keys of Pianofest, 20 Years In". The Southampton Press. 31 July 2008.

1948 births
20th-century American Jews
American classical pianists
Living people
Cleveland Institute of Music faculty
Music Academy of the West alumni
21st-century American Jews